Events from the 6th century in England.

Events
 c. 500
 Angles colonise the North Sea and Humber coastal areas, particularly around Holderness.
 501
 Port and his sons, Bieda and Mægla,  arrive at modern-day Portsmouth.
 519
 Cerdic founds the Kingdom of Wessex.
 527
 Foundation of the Kingdom of Essex.
 536
 The Extreme weather events of 535–536 likely caused a great famine and decline in population.
 547
 Angles under Ida conquer a Celtic area called Bryneich, founding the Kingdom of Bernicia.
 549
 A great plague causes much population loss.
 550
 Gildas completes his post-Roman history On the Destruction of Britain.
 560
 Angles conquer eastern Yorkshire and the British kingdom of Ebrauc, and establish the Kingdom of Deira.
 571
 Foundation of the Kingdom of East Anglia.
Battle of Bedcanford: Cuthwulf captures Limbury,  Aylesbury, Benson, and Eynsham.
 577
 Battle of Deorham: Ceawlin of Wessex captures Gloucester, Cirencester and Bath from the British, expanding his kingdom to the west.
 581
 Ælla enlarges the Kingdom of Deira.
 584
 Battle of Fethanleag, perhaps at Stoke Lyne in Oxfordshire: Ceawlin and Cutha fight against the Britons; the latter is killed and the former returns to his kingdom.
 585
 Foundation of the Kingdom of Mercia.
 590
 Elmet joins an alliance of Celtic kingdoms against the expanding Angles of Bernicia.
Urien of Rheged murdered.
 597
Augustine leads a papal mission to Britain, converts Kent to Christianity, becomes the first Bishop of Canterbury and founds the predecessor of The King's School, Canterbury.
 598
 Traditional foundation date of St Augustine's Abbey, Canterbury.
 c. 600
 Battle of Catraeth (perhaps Catterick, North Yorkshire): Northumbria defeats an invasion by a combined force from Wales and Lothian.
 Possible foundation date of Repton Abbey.

References

 
British history timelines